The Pyrenulales are an order of ascomycetous fungi within the class Eurotiomycetes and within the subphylum Pezizomycotina.

Taxonomy
As of 2022 the order contains one family, 14 genera and around 296 species.
Order Pyrenulales 
Family Pyrenulaceae 
Anthracothecium  – 5 species
Blastodesmia  – 1 species
Clypeopyrenis  – 2 species
Distopyrenis  – 8 species
Granulopyrenis  – 6 species
Lithothelium  – 28 species
Mazaediothecium  – 4 species
Pyrenographa  – 1 species
Pyrenowilmsia  – 1 species
Pyrenula  (=Heufleridium ; =Stromatothelium ) – circa 225 species
Pyrgillus  – 8 species
Sulcopyrenula  – 5 species
Pyrenulales incertae sedis
Rhaphidicyrtis  – 1 species
Xenus  – 1 species

References

Pyrenulales
Ascomycota orders
Lichen orders